The Privy Council Office is the central agency of the Government of Canada which acts as the secretariat to the Cabinet of Canada – a committee of the King's Privy Council for Canada – and provides non-partisan advice and support to the Canadian ministry, as well as leadership, coordination, and support to the departments and agencies of government.

The clerk of the Privy Council, who leads the department, is the head of the civil service of Canada, and acts as the deputy minister to the prime minister, who is the minister responsible for the department. The Privy Council Office is located in the Office of the Prime Minister and Privy Council building (previously known as Langevin Block) on Parliament Hill.

Overview
Although the Privy Council Office has grown in size and complexity over the years, its main pillars remain the operations and plans secretariats. The former is primarily concerned with coordinating the day-to-day issues of government while the latter takes a medium-term view to the evolution of the Canadian federation. Each incoming prime minister will re-organize the Privy Council Office to suit the policy agenda of their government. Today, the Privy Council Office includes a department of intergovernmental affairs, secretariats for communications, foreign and defence policy, security and intelligence, social affairs, economic affairs, legislation and house planning and machinery of government.

Traditionally, the Privy Council Office has served as a "finishing school" for civil servants destined for executive positions within government. Officials who spend several years gaining experience at the Privy Council Office, and working on policy matters from the perspective of the prime minister, return to their home departments with a greater appreciation of government operations at the corporate level. Aside from senior positions within the civil service. Alumni Privy Council Office have gone on to pursue successful careers in business and politics, including Paul Tellier, former chief executive officer of Bombardier; Michael Sabia, chief executive officer of Bell Canada; Robert Rabinovitch, chief executive officer of the Canadian Broadcasting Corporation; former Prime Minister Pierre Trudeau; and former Minister of Foreign Affairs Pierre Pettigrew.

The head of the civil service has the title of clerk of the Privy Council, and also serves as the secretary to the Cabinet and deputy minister to the prime minister.

The Privy Council Office's role is different from that of the Prime Minister's Office, which is a personal and partisan office. It is understood that the prime minister should not receive advice from only one institutionalized source. To that end, the Privy Council Office serves as the policy-oriented but politically-neutral advisory unit to the prime minister, while the Prime Minister's Office is politically-oriented but policy-sensitive.

Current structure of the Privy Council Office
 Clerk of the Privy Council and Secretary to the Cabinet
 Deputy Secretary to the Cabinet, Operations
 Assistant Secretary to the Cabinet, Economic and Regional Development Policy
 Assistant Secretary to the Cabinet, Social Development Policy
 Assistant Secretary to the Cabinet, Review of Laws and Policies Related to Indigenous Peoples
 Assistant Clerk of the Privy Council, Orders-in-Council
 Director, Operations and Cabinet Papers System
 Deputy Secretary to the Cabinet, Plans and Consultations
 Assistant Secretary to the Cabinet, Priorities and Planning
 Assistant Secretary to the Cabinet, Communications and Consultations
 Assistant Secretary to the Cabinet, Liaison Secretariat for Macroeconomic Policy
 Deputy Secretary to the Cabinet, Results and Delivery
 Assistant Secretary to the Cabinet, Results and Delivery
 Assistant Secretary to the Cabinet, Central Innovation Hub
 Deputy Secretary to the Cabinet, Governance
 Assistant Secretary to the Cabinet, Machinery of Government and Democratic Institutions
 Assistant Secretary to the Cabinet, Parliamentary Affairs
 Deputy Secretary to the Cabinet, Senior Personnel and Public Service Renewal
 Assistant Secretary to the Cabinet, Senior Personnel
 Assistant Secretary to the Cabinet, Public Service Renewal
 Assistant Deputy Minister, Corporate Services Branch
 National Security and Intelligence Advisor to the Prime Minister
 Assistant Secretary to the Cabinet, Security and Intelligence
 Assistant Secretary to the Cabinet, Intelligence Assessment
 Deputy Minister and Foreign and Defence Policy Advisor to the Prime Minister
 Assistant Secretary to the Cabinet, Foreign and Defence Policy
 Deputy Minister of Intergovernmental Affairs and Youth
 Assistant Deputy Minister, Intergovernmental Affairs
 Executive Director, Youth

See also
 King's Privy Council for Canada

References

External links
 Privy Council Office
 Role and Structure of the Privy Council Office

Federal departments and agencies of Canada
1867 establishments in Canada